Joshua Spencer Thompson (1828 – December 20, 1880) was a Canadian journalist and politician.

Born in Belfast, Ireland, Thompson emigrated to British Columbia in 1858.  Thompson was a journalist and accountant prior to becoming an MP. A Liberal-Conservative, Thompson sat in the 1st Canadian Parliament as a Member of Parliament in the House of Commons of Canada following his acclamation as member for Cariboo in the special byelection held in 1871 after British Columbia's entry into Confederation.  His only actual electoral race was in the 1874 election; in the 1878 election he was acclaimed again and did not seek a further term in office after that. Thompson died in Victoria, British Columbia.

References 

1828 births
1880 deaths
Conservative Party of Canada (1867–1942) MPs
Members of the House of Commons of Canada from British Columbia
Politicians from Belfast
Pre-Confederation British Columbia people
Canadian people of Ulster-Scottish descent
Irish emigrants to pre-Confederation British Columbia